Slovincian may refer to:

 Slovincian language, an extinct Slavic language
 Slovincians, Slavic people in Poland